The Creation Society was a left-wing cultural organisation in China to encourage literary and cultural exploration. The founders wished to establish a 'society of art for art's sake'. The Society was established by a group of students who were studying in Japan, such as Guo Moruo, Yu Dafu, Zhang Ziping, Tian Han, Zheng Boqi, and Cheng Fangwu. The Society was banned by the Nationalist government in 1929.

References

1921 establishments in China
1929 disestablishments